Gen. Jan Smuts became Prime Minister, after Louis Botha's death in September 1919. In the general election of 1920, with 134 seats elected to the lower house, the South African Party led by Jan Smuts was ahead by three seats against the National Party (44 seats). Both parties then found themselves forced to form alliances with third parties (unionists and labour) to form the new government. The South African Party was quick to form an alliance with the pro-British Unionist Party (25 seats) and Jan Smuts was reappointed prime minister. Shortly after in the same year, the Unionists agreed to join the South African Party and early general elections were held in February 1921.

Cabinet

Sources

External links

Government of South Africa
Executive branch of the government of South Africa
Cabinets of South Africa
1920 establishments in South Africa
1921 disestablishments in South Africa
Cabinets established in 1920
Cabinets disestablished in 1921
Jan Smuts